Dites-lui que je l'aime (English: Tell Her I Love Her) is a 1977 French film directed by Claude Miller and starring Gérard Depardieu and Miou-Miou. It is based on the 1961 novel This Sweet Sickness by Patricia Highsmith.

Plot 
David Martinaud is an accountant who leaves town for the weekends on the pretense that he is going to his native home to care for his parents, who are in fact dead. He is really fixing up a chalet, where he intends to move in with Lise, a woman he has loved since childhood - even though Lise is married to another man and has a child. Nevertheless, David begins stalking her, intent on making her love him by any means necessary.

Cast 
Gérard Depardieu - David Martinaud
Miou-Miou - Juliette
Claude Piéplu - Chouin
Jacques Denis - Gérard Dutilleux
Dominique Laffin - Lise
Christian Clavier - François
Xavier Saint-Macary - Michel Barbet
Véronique Silver - Madame Barbet
Annick Le Moal - Camille
Josiane Balasko - Nadine
Michel Pilorgé - Maurice
Jacqueline Jeanne - Jeanne
Michel Such - Raymond
Nathan Miller - Child

Awards
The film received six César nominations, for best director, actor, actress, cinematography, production design and sound.

References

External links 

 

1977 films
French drama films
French thriller films
1970s psychological thriller films
Films based on American novels
Films based on works by Patricia Highsmith
Films directed by Claude Miller
Films about stalking
1970s French films